Amaia Ugartamendía Sagarzazu (born 9 June 1966) is a Spanish team handball player who played for the club Ent. Pegaso and on the Spanish national team. She was born in Gipuzkoa. She competed at the 1992 Summer Olympics in Barcelona, where the Spanish team placed seventh.

References

1966 births
Living people
People from Errenteria
Spanish female handball players
Olympic handball players of Spain
Handball players at the 1992 Summer Olympics
Sportspeople from Gipuzkoa
Handball players from the Basque Country (autonomous community)